Robert Valentine Braddock (born August 5, 1940) is an American country songwriter and record producer. A member of the Country Music Hall of Fame and the Nashville Songwriters Hall of Fame, Braddock has contributed numerous hit songs during more than 40 years in the industry, including 13 number-one hit singles.

Early years
Braddock was born in Lakeland, Florida, to a father who was a citrus grower.  Braddock spent his youth in Auburndale, Florida, where he learned to play piano and saxophone.  The musician toured Florida and the South with rock and roll bands in the late 1950s and early 1960s.  At the age of 24, Braddock moved to Nashville, Tennessee, to pursue a career in country music.

Musical success
After arriving in Nashville, Braddock joined Marty Robbins' band as a pianist in February 1965. In January of the next year, a song he wrote for Robbins, "While You're Dancing", became Braddock's first record to appear on the charts.  He then signed his first of five recording contracts with major record labels and a publishing contract with Tree Publishing Company, now Sony BMG.  Braddock quickly established himself as a bankable songwriter, penning songs in the 1970s for such artists as The Statler Brothers, Tammy Wynette, George Jones, Nancy Sinatra, Johnny Duncan, Willie Nelson, Tanya Tucker, Jerry Lee Lewis, and Tommy Overstreet.

Braddock continued his successful songwriting career well into the 21st century, writing songs recorded by artists including Lacy J. Dalton, T.G. Sheppard, John Anderson, Mark Chesnutt, and Tracy Lawrence.  Braddock sometimes co-wrote songs with Curly Putman or Sonny Throckmorton, fellow members of the Nashville Songwriters Hall of Fame.

As a producer, Braddock's greatest success thus far is the discovery of country singer Blake Shelton, securing a recording deal in 2001.  Braddock is credited as producer for several of Shelton's number-one country hits, including his debut single "Austin" which spent five weeks at the top of the charts.

Also in 2001 Braddock penned the song "I Wanna Talk About Me", intended for Shelton but eventually recorded by Toby Keith.  "I Wanna Talk About Me" topped the Billboard Country Charts for five weeks in 2002.

In March 2007, Braddock released a memoir recounting his early life in pre-Disney World Central Florida, titled Down in Orbundale: A Songwriters Youth in Old Florida, published by Louisiana State University Press.

Braddock currently resides in Nashville and continues to write songs for the publishing company Sony/ATV.

In July 2017, Braddock was featured in an Episode of Malcolm Gladwell's Podcast, ''Revisionist History", which analyzed the emotional appeal of country music relative to other genres. Gladwell dubbed Braddock 'The King of Tears'.

Books

In 2007, Braddock published a memoir, Down in Orburndale.

In 2015, Vanderbilt University Press published Bobby Braddock: A Life on Nashville's Music Row, a second memoir of Braddock's tumultuous career in Nashville's music industry. The book was aided by 85 of the author's personal journals going back as far as 1971.

Awards and recognition
 The George Jones classic, "He Stopped Loving Her Today," which Braddock co-wrote with Curly Putman, won the Country Music Association Song of the Year award two years in a row (1980 and 1981) and the 1981 Song of the Year from the Academy of Country Music.  This song was voted "Country Song of the Century" in a poll by Radio & Records magazine, as well as "Best Country Song of All Time" in a poll conducted by the BBC and Country America magazine.
 1981 Music City News Songwriter of the Year
 1981 Nashville Songwriters Association Song of the Year
 1981 Inductee into the Nashville Songwriters Hall of Fame
 2011 Inductee into the Country Music Hall of Fame

Songwriting
Songs Braddock wrote or co-wrote that made the Billboard country singles chart include:

Albums
Between the Lines 1979
Love Bomb 1980
Hardpore Cornography 1983

Singles

References

External links
 Bobby Braddock Tribute Website
 Biography from dizzyrambler.com
 Interview with Music Journalist Larry Wayne Clark
 2005 Article from Songwriter Universe Magazine
 Podcast interview with author Malcolm Gladwell

American country singer-songwriters
1940 births
Living people
Musicians from Lakeland, Florida
Country Music Hall of Fame inductees
Members of the Country Music Association
Singer-songwriters from Florida
People from Auburndale, Florida
Country musicians from Florida
American male singer-songwriters